A lay preacher is a preacher or a religious proclaimer who is not a formally ordained cleric and who may not hold a formal university degree in theology. Lay preaching varies in importance between religions and their sects. Although lay preachers in many Christian denominations may be accorded titles such as "pastor" as a courtesy by people – including those in their congregation – it is only once a priest or minister has been ordained that they can correctly adopt that title. 

Lay ecclesial ministry is a similar practice in the Catholic Church. Lay ecclesial ministers serve the church in many ways, assisting priests, but are not ordained.

Examples of lay preachership
Specific groups of lay preachers, and other groups that encourage lay preachership, include:
 Awakening (Lutheran movement; especially see Hans Nielsen Hauge, Paavo Ruotsalainen, and lay preachers organized by Lars Levi Laestadius)
 Methodist local preachers (Great Britain)
 Lay speakers (United Methodist Church)
 Lay readers (Anglican communion)
 Plymouth Brethren
 United Reformed Church preachers (England)
 Unitarian & Free Christian accredited lay preacher (Great Britain)

See also 
 Lay presidency, celebrating the Lord's Supper while unordained
 Lay brother (lay sister)
 Lay leader
 Practicing without a license
 Universal priesthood

References

Religious occupations
Religious terminology
Christian religious leaders